Antanimbary is a town and commune in Madagascar. It belongs to the district of Maevatanana, which is a part of Betsiboka Region. The population of the commune was estimated to be approximately 3,000 in 2001 commune census.

Antanimbary has a riverine harbour. Only primary schooling is available. The majority 60% of the population of the commune are farmers, while an additional 25% receives their livelihood from raising livestock. The most important crops are rice and raffia palm, while other important agricultural products are cassava and sweet potatoes.  Services provide employment for 5% of the population. Additionally fishing employs 10% of the population.

Infrastructure
Route Nationale 4 from Antananarivo to Mahajanga.

References and notes 

Populated places in Betsiboka